Open education is an educational movement founded on openness, with connections to other educational movements such as critical pedagogy, and with an educational stance which favours widening participation and inclusiveness in society. Open education broadens access to the learning and training traditionally offered through formal education systems and is typically (but not necessarily) offered through online and distance education. The qualifier "open" refers to the elimination of barriers that can preclude both opportunities and recognition for participation in institution-based learning. One aspect of openness or "opening up" education is the development and adoption of open educational resources in support of open educational practices.

An example of an institutional practice in line with open education would be decreasing barriers to entry, for example, eliminating academic admission requirements. Universities which follow such practices include the Open University in Britain, Athabasca University and Thompson Rivers University, Open Learning in Canada and the Open University of Catalonia, in Spain, among many others (see full list here). Massive open online courses (MOOC) and OpenCourseWare are among the most recent and visible approaches to open education, adopted by universities worldwide. Although many MOOC's have free enrolment, the costs of acquiring a certification may be a barrier. Many open education institutes offer free certification schemes accredited by organizations like UKAS in the UK and ANAB in the United States; others offer a badge.

Origins of open education
Open education is part of a broader openness movement. It has origins, particularly in higher education, to the 17th century in the thinking of John Amos Comenius, who proposed open access to education as a core goal. Some authors have noted scholarly discussion of open education originating in the progressive pedagogy movements of early childhood education, related to the openness of teaching methods and the promotion of learner autonomy within and outside the classroom. Returning to openness in higher education, the postwar era of the 1960s and 1970s faced a "world-wide crisis in education" as education systems responded slowly to the demand for higher education in an era of scientific and economic prosperity requiring new models to meet the needs of a much larger and diversified group of lifelong learners. These conditions led to the establishment of open and distance education systems globally, which itself developed many innovative and progressive ideas of how to meet the educational needs of large and diverse learner populations. The establishment of open education today as a growing part of mainstream education, particularly in higher education, is directly linked to the development of open education universities beginning in the 1970s.

The interconnectedness of open education and scientific and economic progress is no coincidence. Openness in education is connected to the changing needs of societies, cultures, and economies, and in particular to the rapid evolution of digital and networked technologies. Technology, pedagogy, and related socioeconomic developments have a symbiotic relationship with open and distance education, including in the intellectual and theoretical foundations which define its practice.

The most recent emergence of open education is related to the ability to share resources on the web at little cost compared to the distribution of copy righted material common within higher education. Early examples of this are the OpenCourseWare program, established in 2002 by Massachusetts Institute of Technology (MIT), which was followed by more than 200 universities and organisations, and Connexions, established at Rice University in 1999, which transformed into OpenStax. Similar to the Berlin Declaration on Open Access to Knowledge in the Sciences and Humanities from the Open Access movement, are the goals and intentions from open education specified in the Cape Town Open Education Declaration. MOOC is a more recent form of online course based on principles of openness which has gotten increasing attention since the early 2010's, exemplified by online platforms such edX, Coursera and Udacity.

Common features of open education 

Open education is often considered an unequivocal good, part of a larger movement of openness in society (i.e. open knowledge, open government, open access, open data, open source, and open culture). However, critical approaches to open education have also been developed which underline differing perspectives and the need for a nuanced examination of the contexts of openness, a focus on issues of participation, power and social justice, a move beyond the binaries of open and closed as well as examining relationships between formal, non-formal and informal forms of open education and the relationships between teachers and learners. Openness in education is considered both a comprehensible and a contested term with multiple layers and dimensions. It can be characterised as an adaptive, flexible, and evolving concept. Advocates of openness in education argue that to fully realise the benefits of open education, there is a need to focus on open educational practices (OEP). By using OEP, open educators recognise the ubiquity of knowledge across networks and orchestrate learning that aims to promote learner agency, empowerment, and global civic participation. Likewise, there are other parallel movements in education which support openness, included networked learning, connected learning, and social technologies, among others.

Common features of open education in practice attempt to build opportunities for learners to:

 access education, open educational resources, open textbooks, and open scholarship
 collaborate with others, across the boundaries of institutions, institutional systems, and geographic locations
 create and co-create knowledge openly
 integrate formal and informal learning practices, networks, and identities

Theoretical foundations of open education 

Open education is motivated by a belief that learners want to exercise agency in their studies, particularly from a lifelong learning perspective. Throughout its history, open education has been associated with multiple meanings: access, flexibility, equity, collaboration, agency, democratisation, social justice, transparency, and removing barriers. Researchers and practitioners in the field of open education have adopted generic educational theories such as social constructivism, behaviourism, and cognitivism, and then generated their own theoretical foundations following the emergence of open universities and the emergence of powerful and sophisticated digital technologies, such as networked learning or connectivism. Open education has also been influenced by the philosophy of openness, characterised by an emphasis on transparency and collaboration. Initial conceptualisations of open education were characterised by independent study, where learners are independent of time and space through asynchronous learning, but also independent in developing their own learning strategies and practices, focused on personalised learning and learner autonomy and agency.

More recently, theories which support open education have developed in line with the rapid evolution of networked digital technologies and the sophistication of social software. The community of inquiry (CoI) model proposed by Garrison, Anderson, and Archer (2000) was developed to provide conceptual order and act as a heuristic tool for the use of computer-mediated communication in support of educational experiences, particularly relevant for online and open education. The CoI model argues that a meaningful online learning experience is created through a combination of and interaction between cognitive, social, and teaching presence.

A range of other theories and conceptual frameworks relate to open education, including connectivism which adopts a non-linear approach to learning, influenced by complexity theory, where communities of knowledge are formed through connections forged in a networked learning environment. Connectivism relates to openness through its emphasis on learner autonomy and agency and its use of OER. The study of self-determined learning, known as heutagogy also relates to open education, founded on the principles of self-efficacy and capability, meta-cognition and reflection, and non-linear learning. Self determined learning is often viewed as part of a continuum experience between pedagogy, andragogy and heutagogy, reflecting a shift from teacher-centred to learner-determined environments and activities. A learning ecologies framework supports open education through both a lifelong and lifewide learning perspective, which is learning in different places simultaneously across the multiple contexts one inhabits. A learning ecologies approach rests on the possibilities of new technologies in facilitating self-sustaining, interest-driven and boundary crossing learning, interrelated with the openness in education movement. A rhizomatic learning approach can also underlie forms of open education, characterised as an organic process where the curriculum is connected to the community and the learner navigates diversely connected learning environments by making links, negotiating the learning process, and adapting to change. In the most recent theoretical foundations of open education, including connectivism, heutagogy, and rhizomatic learning, openness arises from the learner-centred and non-linear design of learning contexts and resources and the promotion of learner agency and autonomy.

Technology utilized 

Available technologies for open education are important in the overall efficiency of the program. They promote an absolute openness in the dissemination of education, eliminating barriers including, but not limited to, cost and access to free and relevant resources. After available technologies have been found, there need to be appropriate applications on the technologies for the specific online education program.

Since open education usually occurs at a different time and different place for most individuals across the world, certain technologies need to be utilized to enhance the program. These technologies are primarily online and serve a variety of purposes. Websites and other computer-based training may be used to provide lecture notes, assessments, and other course materials. Videos are provided and feature speakers, class events, topic discussions, and faculty interviews. YouTube and iTunesU are often used for this purpose. Students may interact through computer conferencing with Skype, e-mail, online study groups, or annotations on social bookmarking sites. Other course content may be provided through tapes, print, and CDs.

Governments, institutions, and people realize the importance of education. Human knowledge is crucial to producing competent leaders, innovators, and teachers. Educational systems must provide each individual the chance in building a better life. Technology has made the expansion of educational opportunities easier. Through the Internet, students can easily find information practically on any topic while mentors are capable of sharing their expertise with any student within seconds. Educational materials are disseminated to a global audience without additional costs. Evolving technology makes it possible for learners to interact with the global community in the comfort of their homes. Under distance learning, universities and colleges expand their impact through online courses that people in any country can take.

Open education includes resources such as practices and tools that are not hampered by financial, technical, and legal impediments. These resources are used and shared easily within the digital settings. Technology revolutionized techniques in sending receiving information on a daily basis particularly in education. Availability of web resources has transformed everything. Open education is founded on Open Educational Resources (OER) comprised or learning, teaching, and research sources. With Open Education, the costs of textbooks which surged over three times the rate of inflation for many years must not hinder education. Based on the NBC News review of the Department of Labor Bureau of Labor Statistics data, prices of student books increased three times inflation rates from January 1977 until June 2015 reflecting an increase of 1,041 percent.

OER can possibly address this problem since materials are free online and economical in printed form. Resources intended for buying textbooks can be rechanneled towards technology, enhancing the medium of instructions, and lowering debt. Research studies also showed many students learn more because of their access to quality materials. Technology also has unlimited potentials in raising teaching and learning to a higher level.

Critical approaches to open education 

There are a number of concerns regarding the implementation of open education systems, specifically for use in developing countries. These include a potential lack of administrative oversight and quality assurance systems for educators/materials in some programs, infrastructure limitations in developing countries, a lack of equal access to technologies required for students' full participation in online education initiatives, and questions regarding the use of copyrighted materials.

See also 

 Free education
 Open educational practices
 Open educational resources
 Outline of open education
 Personalized learning
 Virginia Open Education Foundation

References

Education theory
Free culture movement
Educational technology
Philosophy of education
Open education